John Co(c)k may refer to:

John Cock (MP for Sandwich), see Sandwich (UK Parliament constituency)
John Cock (MP died 1557), MP for Hertfordshire and Calne
John Cock (RAF officer), Australian-born fighter pilot of World War II
Jack Cock, footballer
John Cok (fl. 1420), MP for Chichester

See also
John Cocke (disambiguation)
John Cocks (disambiguation)
Johncock